This is a list of the current and former capitals of the country subdivisions of China. The history of China and its administrative divisions is long and convoluted; hence, this chart will cover only capitals after the completion of the Mongol conquest of China in 1279, because the modern province was first created during the Mongol Yuan dynasty. A selection of country subdivisions and their capitals before 1279 can be found in the article History of the political divisions of China. Years may not line up perfectly during periods of turmoil (e.g. at the end of each dynasty).

The list includes current and former provinces, as well as other first-level units that have been used over the course of China's recent history, such as autonomous regions, military command zones during the Qing dynasty, and so forth. Unless otherwise specified, a given administrative unit can be assumed to be a province with its present name. Historical names of provinces and entities that are not provinces will be specified as they arise.

Excluded from the list:

 units below the first level;
 Direct-controlled municipalities of China and special administrative regions;
 subnational entities of short-lived regimes, such as the Heavenly Kingdom of Taiping, the Chinese Soviet Republic, Manchukuo, Mengjiang, Wang Jingwei Government, etc. This is because their provinces were usually transitory in existence and tend to be smaller than usual.

Many of the capitals given in this chart have had multiple historical names during different dynasties. In some cases, different names were used concurrently for the same city. This chart gives only the modern names for the sake of simplicity.

For the sake of simplicity, the chart will not attempt to be exhaustive in its descriptions of border changes.

National entities since 1279:

List of capitals:

See also 
 Historical capitals of China
 List of capitals in China
 The Historical Atlas of China

 
 
Capitals
Current and former capitals of subnational entities of China
China, current and former